Valérie Guiyoule (born 3 August 1972 at Paris) is a former French athlete, who specialized in the triple jump.

Biography  
She won three French National Athletic Championships in the triple jump: one in Outdoor in 1995 and two Indoors in 1994 and 1995.

She twice improved the French Triple Jump record: 13.85 m on 8 June 1994 at Reims and 13.94 m on 8 July 1995 at Limoges.

Prize list  
 French Athletic Championships:  
 winner of the triple jump 1995      
 French Indoor Athletics Championships:  
 winner of the triple jump 1994 and 1995

Records

Notes and references  
 Docathlé2003, Fédération française d'athlétisme, 2003, p. 408

External links  
 

1972 births
Living people
French female triple jumpers
Athletes from Paris